The 2012–13 Premier Soccer League season (known as the ABSA Premiership for sponsorship reasons) was the seventeenth season of the Premier Soccer League since its establishment in 1996. The season began in the second week of August 2012.

Orlando Pirates were the defending champions, having won the previous 2011-12 Premier Soccer League (PSL) season, but lost their title to Kaizer Chiefs. The season featured 14 teams from the 2011-12 PSL season and two new teams promoted from the 2011–12 National First Division: Tuks FC and Chippa United who replace relegated Santos and Jomo Cosmos.

Format changes

The 2012–13 season saw the introduction of the Q-innovation system. The league schedule was split into four fixture-blocks referred to as quarters, the first and third blocks had eight fixtures, the second and fourth blocks had seven fixtures.

Prize money was given to the teams who finish top of the table after each block of fixtures.

Prize money

Teams
A total of 16 teams contested the league, including 14 sides from the 2011–12 season and two promoted from the 2011–12 National First Division.

Relegation for Jomo Cosmos to the 2012–13 National First Division was confirmed on 16 May 2012, as Jomo Cosmos maintained their reputation as a yo-yo club, suffering their third relegation from the PSL in five seasons. Santos had finished 15th and thus had to go through the 2011-12 PSL Playoff Tournament alongside Chippa United and Thanda Royal Zulu of the National First Division. Santos were unable to retain their place in the PSL following a 4-3 defeat in the final game of the PSL Playoff Tournament on 30 June 2012 and were subsequently relegated to the National First Division for the 2012-13 season.

Tuks FC earned promotion to the PSL as 2011-12 National First Division Champions. Chippa United, who had finished second in the 2011-12 National First Division season, earned their place in the PSL after defeating Santos and Thanda Royal Zulu in the 3-team PSL promotion tournament. Both teams made their first appearances in the PSL.

Stadiums and locations
Football teams in South Africa tend to use multiple stadiums over the course of a season for their home games. The following table will only indicate the stadium used most often by the club for their home games

 Chippa United will use Athlone Stadium for their home games, because the Philippi Stadium was not up to PLS standards. Games against Pirates and Chiefs will be played at Cape Town Stadium.

Personnel and kits

 Sponsor linked to team ownership

Managerial changes

League table

PSL playoff tournament
The teams that finished second and third during the 2012-13 National First Division season were joined by the team that finished 15th in the 2012-13 Premier Soccer League season in a 3-team promotion and relegation playoff called the PSL Playoff Tournament.

Participants

Format 
The 3 teams participated in a mini-league in which they played one another twice (home and away) with log points being awarded for winning a match (3 points) and drawing a match (1 point). At the conclusion of the mini-league phase the team that was in first place would either earn or maintain their place in the PSL for the 2013-14 season. If the team that finished 15th in the PSL was unable to win the mini-league, they were relegated to the National First Division for the 2013-14 season.

Playoff table 

Pld = Matches played; W = Matches won; D = Matches drawn; L = Matches lost; GF = Goals for; GA = Goals against; GD = Goal difference; Pts = Points(R) = Relegated; (P) = Promoted

Results

Results

Prize money

Statistics
Top goalscorers As of 18 May 2013

Source: Premier Soccer League

See also
 CAF 5 Year Ranking

References

External links
Premier Soccer League (PSL) Official Website
ABSA Premiership
PSL Results
PSL Standings

2012–13 in African association football leagues
1
2012-13